Ghosts and Good Stories is the sixth studio album by American metal band My Ruin, released on September 20, 2010. The album marked 10 years for the husband and wife duo Tairrie B Murphy and Mick Murphy making music together as My Ruin.

Track listing
"Diggin' for Ghosts" - 4:34
"Long Dark Night" - 3:16
"Excommunicated" - 4:00
"Eyes Black" - 3:12
"Money Shot" - 2:53
"Abusing the Muse" - 3:26
"La Ciudad" - 4:11
"Suicide Tuesday" - 3:14
"Saviourself" - 3:46
"Malediction" - 3:58
"Repose" - 3:09
"Turned Out" - 4:24
"Death Knell" - 3:51

References

My Ruin albums
2010 albums